Ewloe is a village and electoral ward in the community of Hawarden in Flintshire, Wales. It is situated close to the Flintshire/Cheshire sector of the Wales-England border. The A55 expressway passes through Ewloe and its most notable landmark is Ewloe Castle. The Ewloe electoral ward had a population at the 2011 Census of 5,420. The urban area of the village is contiguous with Hawarden, Buckley and Shotton. The Office for National Statistics deems Ewloe to form part of the Buckley built-up area, which covers much of Deeside.

Economy
Ewloe grew rapidly during the late 1990s and early 2000s and is now the home of the internet based Moneysupermarket.com and construction company Redrow. HSBC Bank along with many other firms can be found in Ewloe. Flintshire County Council has one of its main offices at Ty Dewy Sant on St David's Park, a building which had previously been occupied by Unilever and before them by the former Alyn and Deeside District Council.

The Village Hotels chain of hotels hosts the 'St David's Hotel' just off the A55 road network in Ewloe. The St David's Park housing estate was built in the 1990s and is known as being a prestigious estate popular with young professionals and families respectively. Increasing numbers of new property and the resulted increase to population in Ewloe led to the opening of a new Co-op supermarket on the St David's Park road, with Ewloe now boasting two Co-op stores around 835 metres apart.

Local residents have shown opposition to plans for the construction of a "superpub" complex in Ewloe by Marston's plc. However, the council have approved plans to build the superpub in St Davids Park, which then opened in September 2010, but was damaged in an arson attack early morning on 6 February 2011.

Education 
Two primary schools exist within the Ewloe and Ewloe Green wards. These are Penarlag CP School and Ewloe Green Primary School.

Secondary students from Ewloe are mostly educated at Hawarden High School in adjacent Hawarden.

Governance
At the lowest level of local government, Ewloe is an electoral ward that elects community councillors to Hawarden Community Council. The other three community electoral divisions are Aston, Hawarden and Mancot.

Ewloe is also a county ward for elections to Flintshire County Council, electing two county councillors.

Notable residents
 In 2004 professional footballer Michael Owen bought a small street of houses, Austen Close in Ewloe, for his extended family. He had grown up and owned a house nearby.
Idwal Davies (1899–1980), a Wales and Bolton Wanderers footballer, was born in nearby Ewloe Green.

References

External links

Photos of Ewloe and surrounding area on geograph.org.uk

Villages in Flintshire
Wards of Flintshire